Joseph Louis Nicholas, Count of Windisch-Graetz, Baron of Waldstein and Thal (6 December 1744 – 24 January 1802 in Štěkeň) was an Austrian nobleman, a member of the House of Windisch-Graetz, and was chamberlain to Archduchess Marie Antoinette of Austria.  He was the second son of Count Leopold Carl Joseph of Windish-Graetz (1718–1746) and his wife Countess Maria Antonia Josepha von Khevenhüller (1726–1746).

Family archive 
On 12 May 1781, he purchased the lordships of Tachov, Ctěnice, and Štěkeň from Ernestine Fuchs von Bimbach, the widow of Count Adam Philipp Losy von Losinthal.  Here he founded his extensive family archive.  His descendants later moved this archive to the former Kladruby monastery, which they had acquired after it had been secularized.

Marriages and issue 
Joseph Nicholas married twice.  His first wife was Countess Maria Josepha Reinharda Raimunda Erdödy de Monyorókerék et Monoszló (5 April 1748 – 10 April 1777).

His second wife was Duchess Maria Leopoldine Franziska of Arenberg (31 July 1751 – 26 August 1812); he married her in Brussels on 30 August 1781.  Their son Alfred (11 May 1787 in Brussels – 21 March 1862, Vienna) was raised to the rank of prince in 1804. Their daughter Sophie Luise married Prince Karl of Löwenstein-Wertheim-Rosenberg.

External links 
 Website of the city of Tachov, with a photo of the former princely castle 
 Website of the Kladruby monastery, with a photo of the former princely library 
 Descendants of Joseph Nicholas, Count of Windisch-Graetz

Footnotes 

1744 births
1802 deaths
18th-century Austrian people
Counts of Austria
Joseph Nicholas
Austrian civil servants
Bohemian people
Royal reburials